

Bracket

Matches

Zambia vs West Germany

Soviet Union vs Australia

Sweden vs Italy

Brazil vs Argentina

Italy vs Soviet Union

West Germany vs Brazil

Italy vs West Germany

Soviet Union vs Brazil

External links
 sports-reference

K
Knock
1988–89 in Italian football
1988–89 in Argentine football
1988 in Swedish football
1988 in Soviet football
1988 in Brazilian football
1988 in Australian soccer
1988 in Zambian sport